Rani (Punjabi, ; 8 December 1946 – 27 May 1993) was a Pakistani film and television actress. She gained success in the late 1960s when she made a hit pair with famous actor and producer Waheed Murad. She was also known as The Dancing Queen, Queen of Lollywood and Lux Girl for her portrayal of romantic and dancing roles in films. She remained one of the most successful actresses of the subcontinent and was also popular for her dance performances in films. Rani died of cancer on 27 May 1993. She received three Nigar Awards in her three decades long career.

Early life
Rani was born on 8 December 1946 as Nasira in Mozang, Lahore to Malik Muhammed Shafi and Iqbal Begum in an Arain family.  Her father was a driver for Mukhtar Begum, a singer and the wife of Agha Hashar Kashmiri, a well-known Urdu dramatist. Mukhtar Begum took over and raised Rani herself. After being raised by Mukhtar Begum, Rani moved in with her mother with whom she reconciled.

Acting career
Rani acted in both Urdu and Punjabi films and was a film heroine in Pakistani films. In 1962 Anwar Kamal Pasha, a veteran film director of the 1950s and 1960s, gave Rani her first role in  the film Mehboob (1962 film).  For several years after Mehoob, Rani appeared in supporting roles in films like Mouj Maila, Ek Tera Sahara and Safaid Khoon. Until 1965 she starred in other films, but when they flopped she was dubbed a jinxed actress.

However, after the success of Hazar Dastan and Dever Bhabi, Rani became a leading actress. Some of her more notable films are Chann Makhna, Sajjan Pyara, Jind Jan, Duniya Matlib Di, Anjuman (1970 film), Tehzeeb (1971 film), Umrao Jaan Ada (1972), Naag Muni, Seeta Mariam Margaret, Aik Gunnah Aur Sahi and Surraya Bhopali. She also acted in two TV serials Khuwahish and Fareb in the early 1990s.

Personal life
After her initial success in the late 1960s, she married renowned director Hassan Tariq, with whom she had a daughter, Rabia. Due to conflicts, Hassan Tariq divorced Rani in the late 1970s. She then married producer Mian Javed Qamar, who divorced her when it was discovered that Rani had cancer. During her treatment in London, she met famous cricketer Sarfaraz Nawaz. Soon they developed a good relationship with each other and got married. Rani helped Sarfraz in his election campaign in the late 1980s. But their relationship also did not last long and they parted. After getting divorced for the third time, Rani was struck by the grief of loneliness. Cancer also struck back and this time with much more intensity as Rani did not have much desire to live but to see her daughter get married.

Illness and death

Rani died of cancer on 27 May 1993 at the age of 46 in Karachi, just a few days after her daughter Rabia's marriage. Shortly after Rani's death, her mother who was seriously ill and never knew of her daughter's death, also died. Rani's only sister also died three months later.
Rani and her mother were buried side by side in Lahore in Muslim Town Cemetery.

Filmography

Television series

Film

Awards and recognition

See also 
 List of Pakistani actresses

References

External links

Filmography of actress Rani on Complete Index To World Film (CITWF) website - Archived

1946 births
Pakistani film actresses
Actresses in Pashto cinema
Pakistani female models
1993 deaths
Nigar Award winners
Pakistani television actresses
Punjabi people
Actresses from Lahore
Actresses in Punjabi cinema
Punjabi women
20th-century Pakistani actresses
Actresses in Urdu cinema